The 2023 Austin FC II season is the club's first season in MLS Next Pro, the third tier of soccer in the United States. They will play in the league's Western Conference.

Background 

Austin FC started playing in the MLS Western Conference in 2021. In August 2022 it was announced that they would launch a MLS Next Pro team for the 2023 season. On December 13, Austin FC announced that Brett Uttley will be the first coach for Austin FC II.

Season

Preseason 
January 4, the team announced it had hired the first two assitant coaches for the team, Dennis Sanchez and Jason Grubb. The next day, Austin FC announced the signing of the first three players to the Austin FC II team, Ugandan Bobosi Byaruhanga, American David Rodríguez, and Dutch player Cheick Touré. Both Byaruhanga and Rodríguez are on season long loans with options to buy. Continuing to work on their 2023 team, Austin FC II signed goalkeeper Eric Lopez on January 10, 2022 from the LA Galaxy II. On January 23, 2023, Austin FC II announced the signing of Anthony De Anda, the first Austin FC Academy player to sign with the team. Continuing to build their inaugural team, Austin FC II announced the signing of Leo Torres and Chris Pinkham on January 24, 2023. On January 31, 2023, Austin FC II announced signing of Emmanuel Johnson on a year-long loan, with purchase option, from Hibernian for its inaugural season. After it first couple of preseason games, Austin FC II continued building their roster by signing Christo Vela on loan from Cancún F.C. on February 13, 2023. As the first team prepared for the first game of the season, Austin FC II continued to build its squad by signing Sébastien Pineau to a two year contaract through the 2024 season. After acquiring an international slot from New York City FC II for cash consideration on March 1, 2023, Austin FC II announced they had signed Alonso Ramírez on a season long loan from Atlas F.C. on March 2, 2023. On March 3, 2023, Austin FC II announced they had signed three of the four Austin FC MLS Super Draft picks. As the opening of the 2023 season approached, Austin FC II announced they had signed two new players, Joe Hafferty and Jonathan Santillan, to the team on March 16, 2023.

Management team

Roster

.

Transfers

In

Loan In

Non-competitive fixtures

Preseason

Competitive fixtures

Major League Soccer Regular Season

Matches

MLS Next Pro Playoffs

Statistics

Appearances and goals

Numbers after plus–sign (+) denote appearances as a substitute.

Notes

References 

 

Austin FC II
Austin FC II
Austin FC II